Sleep messaging (or sleep emailing or sleep texting) is a phenomenon related to sleepwalking where people send emails or other textual communications to co-workers in a combined state of sleep and wakefulness.

References

Parasomnias
Sleep disorders